Trouble Doll (The Disappointing 3rd LP) is the third album by B.A.L.L., released in 1989 through Shimmy Disc. The first half is a studio album that contains new material, while the second half contain a live performance recorded at CBGB in New York City.

Track listing

Personnel 
Adapted from the Trouble Doll (The Disappointing 3rd LP) liner notes.
B.A.L.L.
Don Fleming – vocals, guitar
Kramer – bass guitar, organ, production
Jay Spiegel – drums
Production and additional personnel
Dave Rick – guitar (19–29)

Release history

References

External links 
 

1989 albums
1989 live albums
Albums produced by Kramer (musician)
B.A.L.L. albums
Shimmy Disc albums
Shimmy Disc live albums